Wunder (German for "miracle") may refer to:

People
Eduard Wunder (1800–1869), German philologist
George Wunder (1912–1987), German cartoonist
Herta Wunder (1913–1992), German swimmer
Ingolf Wunder (born 1985),  Austrian pianist
Klaus Wunder (born 1950), German footballer 
Richard Wunder (born 1984), Liechtenstein bobsledder
Wunder (gamer), Danish professional gamer

Companies and product names
Wunder-Baum, a brand of disposable air fresheners

Music
Wunder, a 2012 German-language album by Roger Whittaker
"Wunder", a 2012 song by Andreas Bourani

See also

Wunderkind (disambiguation)
Wunder Beach